Antonis Manitakis (: born 1944) is a Greek university professor and politician. He was a Minister of administrative reform and e-governance (2012/2013) and a former interim Minister of the Interior and Administrative Reconstruction, having served in 2012 and 2015.

Early life and education 
Manitakis was born on 19 April 1944 in Thessaloniki. He studied law at the Law School of the Aristotle University of Thessaloniki and received a doctor of law from the University of Brussels. Afterwards, he was elected as a professor at the Law School of the Aristotle University of Thessaloniki. Antonis Manitakis was a student of Aristovoulos Manesis, whom he succeeded at the Constitutional law seat.

Academic career
During his academic career, he was the dean of the School of Law and Political Sciences, as well as a visiting scholar at the University of Montpellier (1987), the University of Paris X (1989), the University of Rome La Sapienza (1994) and the University of Nantes (2002). From 2004 to 2010, he taught European Constitutional Law at the University of Montpellier's Law School summer seminars.

In 2007, Manitakis was awarded with the award of exceptional university teaching by the President of Greece Karolos Papoulias. He served as a deputy chairman of the National Council of Radio and Television (1997–1999).

Since April 2014, he is the Dean of the School of Law in the Neapolis University in Cyprus

Political career
In May 2012, Manitakis was appointed interim minister of interior to the Caretaker Cabinet of Panagiotis Pikrammenos. On 21 June, after a suggestion made by the Democratic Left, it was announced that he would participate at the Government of Antonis Samaras as the minister of administrative reform and e-governance.

References

External links

|-

1944 births
Aristotle University of Thessaloniki alumni
Academic staff of the Aristotle University of Thessaloniki
Greek jurists
Living people
Ministers of Administrative Reform and e-Governance of Greece
Ministers of the Interior of Greece
Politicians from Thessaloniki